State Road 165 (NM 165) is a  long state highway in the US state of New Mexico. NM 165's western terminus is at Interstate 25 (I-25), U.S. Route 85 (US 85), and US 550 in Bernalillo, and the eastern terminus is at NM 536 north of Sandia Peak Ski Area.

History
NM 165 was established in 1988. It was formerly the eastern section of NM 44.

Major intersections

See also

References

165
Transportation in Bernalillo County, New Mexico
Transportation in Sandoval County, New Mexico